Santa Cecilia Airport  is an airport serving the village of Santa Cecilia in Sucumbíos Province, Ecuador.

See also

 List of airports in Ecuador
 Transport in Ecuador

References

External links
 HERE Maps - Santa Cecilia
 OpenStreetMap - Santa Cecilia
 

Airports in Ecuador